Kabalebo Airstrip  serves the village of Kabalebo, Suriname. It was constructed as part of Operation Grasshopper.

Facilities
The Kabalebo Airstrip has one long unpaved runway.
The main-lodge of the Kabalebo Nature Resort and its swimming pool are adjacent to the runway.

Airlines and destinations 
Currently, no scheduled services are offered from Kabalebo.
Charter Airlines serving this airport are:

Accidents and incidents 
 On 23 June 1965 a Beech G18S, registration PZ-TAR from the Surinaamse Luchtvaart Maatschappij equipped with JATO (Jet Assisted Take Off) rockets crashed at Kabalebo. There were no fatalities; the pilot was J. den Besten.

See also

 List of airports in Suriname
 Transport in Suriname

References

External links
 OpenStreetMap - Kabalebo
OurAirports - Kabalebo
Kabalebo Airport

Airports in Suriname
Sipaliwini District